A telecom network protocol analyzer is a protocol analyzer to analyze a switching and signaling telecommunication protocol between different nodes in PSTN or Mobile telephone networks, such as 2G or 3G GSM networks, CDMA networks, WiMAX and so on. 

In a mobile telecommunication network it can analyze the traffic between MSC and BSC, BSC and BTS, MSC and HLR, MSC and VLR, VLR and HLR, and so on.

Protocol analyzers are mainly used for performance measurement and troubleshooting. These devices connect to the network to calculate key performance indicators to monitor the network and speed-up troubleshooting activities.

External links 
 GL Communications GSM Protocol Analyzer Overview
 Tektronix Protocol Analyzer Overview
 Utel Systems - Network Monitoring

Mobile telecommunications
Network analyzers
Network performance